Keskisaari (in Finnish ‘keski’ means middle and ‘saari’ means island) is a place name and family name in Finland. There are a number of places called Keskisaari around Finland, including Lappee (Lapvesi) and Koivisto (Björkö) in Carelia and Maaninka.

Origin
In Maaninka Keskisaari there is an early Iron Age burial site

Present
The Koivisto Keskisaari is no longer a part of Finland since the Second World War.

References 

Finnish-language surnames